Mark O'Brien (born May 7, 1984) is a Canadian actor and director best known for his roles as Des Courtney in Republic of Doyle and Tom Rendon in Halt and Catch Fire. He won the Canadian Screen Award for Best Actor at the 8th Canadian Screen Awards for his performance as Terry Sawchuk in the biographical drama film Goalie.

At the 10th Canadian Screen Awards in 2022 he received two nominations for his film The Righteous, for both Best Supporting Actor and Best Original Screenplay.

Personal life
O'Brien married actress Georgina Reilly on January 6, 2013, after having met on the set of Republic of Doyle in 2011.
He is an English major with a Bachelor of Arts from Memorial University of Newfoundland. His mother was a nurse and his father a truck driver. Mark also has three older sisters.

Filmography

Film

Television

Director, producer and writer

References

External links

1984 births
Living people
21st-century Canadian male actors
Best Actor Genie and Canadian Screen Award winners
Canadian film editors
Film producers from Newfoundland and Labrador
Canadian male film actors
Canadian male screenwriters
Canadian male television actors
Film directors from Newfoundland and Labrador
Male actors from Newfoundland and Labrador
Writers from St. John's, Newfoundland and Labrador
21st-century Canadian screenwriters